Paul Grimm may refer to:
Paul A. Grimm (1892–1974), artist
Paul Grimm (prehistorian) (1907–1993), German prehistorian and medieval archaeologist
Paul W. Grimm (born 1951), United States District Judge